The 1987 Norwegian Football Cup was the 82nd edition of the Norwegian annual knockout football tournament. The Cup was won by Bryne after they beat Brann in the cup final with the score 1–0. This was Bryne's first Norwegian Cup title.

From this season, the penalty shoot-outs were replaced the replays in the first three rounds.

First round

|colspan="3" style="background-color:#97DEFF"|30 May 1987

|-
|colspan="3" style="background-color:#97DEFF"|31 May 1987

|-
|colspan="3" style="background-color:#97DEFF"|1 June 1987

|}

Second round

|colspan="3" style="background-color:#97DEFF"|23 June 1987

|-
|colspan="3" style="background-color:#97DEFF"|24 June 1987

|-
|colspan="3" style="background-color:#97DEFF"|25 June 1987

|}

Third round

|colspan="3" style="background-color:#97DEFF"|7 July 1987

|-
|colspan="3" style="background-color:#97DEFF"|8 July 1987

|}

Fourth round

|colspan="3" style="background-color:#97DEFF"|2 August 1987

|-
|colspan="3" style="background-color:#97DEFF"|Replay: 5 August 1987

|}

Quarter-finals

|colspan="3" style="background-color:#97DEFF"|19 August 1987

|-
|colspan="3" style="background-color:#97DEFF"|Replay: 1 September 1987

|-
|colspan="3" style="background-color:#97DEFF"|2nd replay: 3 September 1987

|}

Semi-finals

|colspan="3" style="background-color:#97DEFF"|19 September 1987

|-
|colspan="3" style="background-color:#97DEFF"|20 September 1987

|}

Final

Bryne's winning team: Lars Gaute Bø, Kolbjørn Ekker, Bjørn Gulden (Geir Giljarhus 100), Leif Rune Salte, Roar Pedersen, Hugo Hansen, Tor Fosse, Paal Fjeldstad, Arne Larsen Økland, Børre Meinseth, Jan Madsen and (Paul Folkvord 115).

Brann's team: Bjarni Sigurdsson, Hans Brandtun, Per Egil Ahlsen, Jan Halvor Halvorsen, Redouane Drici (Per Hilmar Nybø 91), Erik Solér, Arne Møller, Lars Moldestad (Knut Arild Løberg 64), Odd Johnsen, Halvor Storskogen and Trond Nordeide.

References 
Bryne's home page

External links
http://www.rsssf.no

Norwegian Football Cup seasons
Norway
Football Cup